Hugo Klempfner (6 January 1902 – 1 February 1969) was a Czech water polo player. He competed in the men's tournament at the 1924 Summer Olympics.

References

External links
 

1902 births
1969 deaths
Czechoslovak male water polo players
Olympic water polo players of Czechoslovakia
Water polo players at the 1924 Summer Olympics
Sportspeople from Prague